William White, FSA (1825–1900) was an English architect, noted for his part in 19th-century Gothic Revival architecture and church restorations.

He was the son of a clergyman, and great nephew of the writer and naturalist Gilbert White of Selborne. After a five-year apprenticeship in Leamington Spa he moved to London as an improver in George Gilbert Scott's practice, where he remained for two years before setting up his own practice in Truro in 1847. In 1851 he returned to London and worked out of Wimpole Street. His style was close to that of William Butterfield and he built many churches.

Works

Cornwall 

 St Michael's parish church, Baldhu (new build), 1848
 Maryfield House, Antony, near Torpoint (school, house and vicarage), 1848
 Bank and Solicitors Offices, Truro (new commercial premises for the Cornish Bank and solicitors offices), 1849. Now Charlotte's Tea House and Pizza Express.
 St Gerrent, Gerrans (rebuild apart from tower and spire), 1850
 St Felicitas and St Piala's Church, Phillack, 1856–1857
 St Philip and St James parish church, Antony, near Torpoint
 House at Lower Town, Colan, Mountjoy, circa 1875
 St Peter's parish church, Mithian, near St Agnes, 1861
 Bank House, at St Columb Major, circa 1857
 House at Denzell, near St Columb Major
 The Old Rectory, St Columb Major
 Penmellyn House, St Columb Major
 Rosemellyn House, St Columb Major, 1871
 St Hilary's parish church, rebuilt on the old foundations in 1855
 Rectory for Canon Reginald Hobhouse at St Ive, 1852–54
 St Moren parish church, Lamorran, 1845, restoration
 St Petroc's parish church, Little Petherick, 1858
 St Peter's parish church, Mithian, 1861
 Trewan Hall, alterations and additions, 1870

Devon 

 Bishop's Court, Sowton. This former bishop's palace was remodelled in the 1860s and is considered by English Heritage to be one of White's most important domestic buildings; he carefully designed the fittings and much of the furniture, with exceptional attention to detail, specifically for the house.
 St Michael's parish church, Clyst Honiton
 St Nicholas & St Giles parish church, Sidmouth
 Holy Trinity parish church, Barnstaple, 1867
 St Mary's parish church, Upton Pyne, alterations 1874–75
 St Michael and All Angels parish church, Cadbury, Devon, restoration in 1857
 St John the Baptist parish church, Instow, restored 1872–73
 St Peter's parish church, Shirwell, heavily restored 1880s
 Holy Trinity parish church, West Down, restored 1874
 Dartington Hall, South Hams, remodelled and extended again in about 1860
 Winscott House, Peters Marland, 1865, for John Curzon Moore-Stevens, Esq.
 St Peter's parish church, Peters Marland, 1865, financed by John Curzon Moore-Stevens, Esq., of Winscott House. Rebuilding of nave and chancel, ancient tower unaltered.

Essex 

 St Giles parish church, Great Maplestead
 St Laurence and All Saints Church, Eastwood, restoration, 1873–75

Hampshire 

 Christ Church, Freemantle, Southampton, consecrated 1865
 St Mark's parish church, Woolston, consecrated 17 November 1863
 St Mary's parish church, Selborne, restoration, 1856
 St Michael and All Angels church, Lyndhurst, between 1890 and 1892

Lincolnshire

Heydour. The Old Vicarage, 1857. Nikolaus Pevsner: "Picturesque and asymmetrical, varied roof lines, tile hung gables and pointed arches picked out in red brick". The vicarage is a precursor to the Queen Anne style of architecture.

London 

 St Mark's parish church, Battersea Rise, 1872–74
 St Saviour's parish church, Aberdeen Park, Islington, 1865–66
 All Saints parish church, Kensington
 Forest School Chapel, College Place, Waltham Forest, built 1857 and enlarged 1875
 St Michael's parish church, Wandsworth Common, 1881
 St Dionis Vicarage, 18 Parsons Green, Fulham, 1898–99

Oxfordshire 

 All Saints parish church, Mollington, restoration, 1856
 St James parish church, Claydon, restoration, 1860
 St Lawrence's parsonage, Milcombe, 1861–62
 All Saints parish church, Great Bourton, almost completely rebuilt, 1863
 Holy Trinity Vicarage, Finstock, 1864
 St Giles parish church, Wigginton, restoration of chancel and south aisle, 1870
 Belfried gate tower for All Saints parish church, Great Bourton, 1882

Surrey 

 St John the Divine parish church, Felbridge, 1865
 St John's Vicarage, Felbridge

Sussex 

 St Mary the Virgin parish church, Littlehampton, West Sussex, new chancel and restoration, 1899
 St Peter and St Paul parish church, West Wittering, West Sussex

Wiltshire 

 St Michael's church, Axford, 1856
 School and master's house, Chute, 1857–8 (now village hall)
 St Michael the Archangel, Brixton Deverill, refenestrated and chancel extended, 1862
 Church of the Holy Saviour, Westbury Leigh: nave and chancel 1876–7; south aisle, 1888–9; tower, 1899

Other counties of England 

 Holy Innocents parish church, Adisham, Kent, restoration, 1869
 Quy Hall, Stow-cum-Quy, Cambridgeshire, rebuilding, 1869–71
St. James and St. John parish church, Derwent, Derbyshire
 Holy Trinity parish church, Elvington, York, East Riding of Yorkshire, 1876–77
 Holy Cross & St. Mary's parish church, Quainton, Buckinghamshire, 1877
 St Leonard's parish church, Sandridge, Hertfordshire, comprehensive restoration, 1886–87
 Stained glass in Holy Trinity, Touchen End, Berkshire
 The Old Vicarage, Irton, Holmrook, Cumbria, 1864

Ireland 

 Humewood Castle, Wicklow Mountains, Ireland

South Africa 

 St, Batholomew's Church, Grahamstown
 Armstrong House and Espin House, St. Andrew's College, Grahamstown

Madagascar 

 St. Lawrence Anglican Cathedral Ambohimanoro, Antananarivo

White's contemporaries in the Gothic Revival 

 James Brooks
 Richard Cromwell Carpenter
 John Loughborough Pearson
 Benjamin Mountfort
 James Piers St Aubyn
 George Edmund Street
 Henry Woodyer

Notes and references

External links

 

1825 births
1900 deaths
19th-century English architects
English ecclesiastical architects
Gothic Revival architects
Architects from Warwickshire